Sir Simon Haughton Clarke, 9th Baronet (1764–1832) was a West Indies merchant, said to be the seventh richest man in England. He had a notable collection of paintings at his mansion at Oakhill. His estate, bought in 1821, ran from Chase Side, Southgate to High Road, Whetstone. After his death, his widow and sons lived at Oakhill until 1857 when the estate was broken up.

He is remembered in a monument at St Mary the Virgin churchyard in East Barnet, originally visible from Oakhill house.

Family

Clarke had at least two sons with his wife, both of whom were baronets. They were:
 Sir Simon Haughton Clarke, 10th Baronet
 Sir Philip Haughton Clarke, 11th Baronet

See also
 Clarke baronets

References

External links 

1764 births
1832 deaths
East Barnet
18th-century British businesspeople
Baronets in the Baronetage of England
19th-century British businesspeople
British slave owners
Clarke baronets